Towersey is a village and civil parish about  east of Thame in Oxfordshire. Towersey was part of Buckinghamshire until 1933, when the county boundary was moved and Towersey was exchanged for Kingsey. The 2011 Census recorded Towersey parish's population as 433.

Toponym
The toponym "Towersey" is derived from Old and Middle English. The Domesday Book of 1086 records it as simply Eia, meaning "island". This refers to a dry area of land in the marshes of the Aylesbury Vale, on the edge of which the village stands.  A manuscript of 1174 records Kingsey also as simply Eya, but thereafter both toponyms gained prefixes to distinguish the two villages. A manuscript of 1194 refers to Kingseie, which has evolved into "Kingsey". Mid-13th-century records refer to Turrisey and Tureseye, which has evolved into "Towersey". It means "island of de Turs", referring to Richard de Turs, who held the manor from 1252.

Parish church
The earliest part of the Church of England parish church of Saint Catherine is its 13th-century Early English Gothic chancel. The nave was rebuilt early in the 14th century and is Decorated Gothic. In 1850–54 the church was restored under the direction of the architect James Cranston, who added the bell tower in its slightly unusual position on the south side of the nave.  The tower has a ring of four bells. Ellis I Knight of Reading, Berkshire cast the second, third and tenor bells in 1627. Richard Keene of Woodstock cast the treble bell in 1695. St Catherine's also has a Sanctus bell that Keene cast in 1699.  St Catherine's is now one of eight parishes in the Benefice of Thame.

Railway

The line opened in 1862. Thame was the nearest station until 1933, when the Great Western Railway opened  on the west side of the bridge. British Railways withdrew passenger services in January 1963 and freight services to Thame in 1991. The track has since been lifted. The former railway bridge with its steel span over Chinnor Road survives. The trackbed has been converted into the Phoenix Trail for cycling, horseriding and walking between Prince's Risborough and Thame.

Amenities

Towersey has a public house, the Three Horseshoes.  The village is the setting for the Towersey Village Festival which is a festival of folk music and dance. It was founded in 1965 and is held annually on August bank holiday weekend. Its foundation was followed by the foundation in 1966 of a Cotswold Morris side, Towersey Morris, which still performs today.

References

Sources and further reading

External links

Towersey Village
St Catherine's Church Towersey
Towersey Festival

Civil parishes in Oxfordshire
Villages in Oxfordshire